Marjolein Buis (born 11 January 1988) is a Dutch retired wheelchair tennis player. Buis won 18 singles titles and 52 doubles titles. She won the gold medal in the women's doubles event with Esther Vergeer along with six grand slam doubles and two masters titles. In 2016 Buis won her only grand slam singles title at the French Open. Buis had a career high ranking of No. 3 in singles and No. 1 in doubles.

Marjolein Buis was born in Nijmegen, the Netherlands. At the age of 14 she started to experience problems when walking. It turned out that she has a connective tissue disorder, the Ehlers–Danlos syndrome, which affects the stability of the joints. This left her unable to play able bodied sports.
At the age of 17, Buis discovered wheelchair tennis. In 2010, she graduated in Social Work and became a full-time tennis player. She qualified for the Paralympic Games in London 2012 and reached the quarterfinal in singles and won gold in doubles with her partner Esther Vergeer. At the Paralympic Games in Rio 2016 Buis reached the quarterfinal in singles again and this time won silver in doubles with her partner Diede de Groot. Buis was a full-time player.

Wheelchair Grand Slam finals

Singles: 1 (1 title)

References

External links
 
 
 

1988 births
Living people
Dutch female tennis players
Wheelchair tennis players
Paralympic wheelchair tennis players of the Netherlands
Paralympic gold medalists for the Netherlands
Paralympic silver medalists for the Netherlands
Medalists at the 2012 Summer Paralympics
Medalists at the 2016 Summer Paralympics
Wheelchair tennis players at the 2012 Summer Paralympics
Wheelchair tennis players at the 2016 Summer Paralympics
Sportspeople from Nijmegen
People with Ehlers–Danlos syndrome
Australian Open (tennis) champions
French Open champions
US Open (tennis) champions
Paralympic medalists in wheelchair tennis
Wheelchair sports competitors
21st-century Dutch women